Dorceau is a former commune in the Orne department in north-western France. On 1 January 2016, it was merged into the new commune of Rémalard en Perche.

The river Huisne runs alongside the town.

Joseph Aveline was mayor of Dorceau from 1908 until his death in 1958.

See also
Communes of the Orne department
 Joseph Aveline

References

Former communes of Orne